The Historical Museum of Northern Jutland (HMNJ) (Danish: Nordjyllands Historiske Museum) is the product of the fusion of Aalborg Historical Museum, The Museum Society for Hals, The Museum Society of Hadsund, The South Himmerland Museum, and others, in 2004. The museum system in this umbrella organization is administered by a 12-member committee, with members from the participating organizations. The administrative headquarters is in Algade 48, Aalborg.

The Historical Museum of Northern Jutland works with research, collection, documentation, conservation, and promotion of local and cultural history in Aalborg, Mariagerfjord, Rebild, and Jammerbugt Municipality.

The museum's mission is: "Attentive history". According to their website, a more elaborate description reads:

HMNJ is also responsible for care of many of the pre-historic sites like barrows and dolmens, within the associated municipalities.

Exhibitions 

The organization administers these thirteen exhibitions in the region:

 Aalborg Historical Museum
 Gråbrødrekloster Museum
 Apotekersamlingen
 Lindholm Høje Museet
 Cirkusmuseet
 Boldrup Museum
 Hadsund Egnssamling
 Hals Museum
 Havnø Mølle (Møllehistorisk samling)
 Hobro Museum
 Lystfartøjsmuseet
 Mariager Museum
 Vikingecenter Fyrkat

Gallery

See also 

 Fyrkat
 Jens Bang's House
 Lindholm Høje
 Museums in Aalborg

References

External links 
 
 The Historical Museum of Northern Jutland Official homepage

Museums in Denmark
Museums in the North Jutland Region
Museums in Aalborg